This is a list of countries by coal production, based mostly on the Statistical Review of World Energy, ranking countries with coal production larger than 5 million tonnes as of 2020.

References

Energy-related lists by country
Production by country
 
Lists of countries by mineral production
Coal-related lists